Daviesia grossa is a species of flowering plant in the family Fabaceae and is endemic to the south-west of Western Australia. It is an erect, glabrous, spindly shrub with crowded phyllodes and yellow and dark red flowers.

Description

Taxonomy and naming
Daviesia grossa was first formally described in 1995 by Michael Crisp in Australian Systematic Botany from specimens he collected in the Cape Arid National Park in 1979. The specific epithet (grossa) means "large or thick".

Distribution and habitat
This daviesia grows on exposed, rocky places or in heath, but is only known from parts of the Cape Arid National Park in the Mallee region of south-western Western Australia.

Conservation status
Daviesia grossa is listed as "not threatened" by the Department of Biodiversity, Conservation and Attractions.

References

grossa
Eudicots of Western Australia
Plants described in 1995
Taxa named by Michael Crisp